Jeffrey Taylor (born January 30, 1961) is an American political scientist, politician, and a Republican member of the Iowa Senate from District 2 since January 11, 2021.

Early life and career
Taylor is from Spencer, Iowa. He attended Northwestern College before completing a master's degree from the University of Iowa and a master's and doctorate from the University of Missouri. As a scholar, he was an early exponent of the horseshoe theory of political ideology. Taylor taught at Dordt University for eight years prior to running for public office in 2020. Taylor was also a political analyst for KCAU-TV.

Political career
In 2012, Taylor served as a delegate to the Republican National Convention from Iowa.

In October 2019, Taylor announced that he would be seeking election to the Iowa Senate, as incumbent Randy Feenstra vacated the seat to run for the United States House of Representatives. Taylor's candidacy in the Republican Party primary was certified in February 2020. Taylor reported that more than 250 signatures were submitted in his petition for ballot access. He was unopposed in the primary and general elections.

Published works

References 

1961 births
Living people
21st-century American politicians
Republican Party Iowa state senators
Dordt University faculty
Northwestern College (Iowa) alumni
University of Iowa alumni
University of Missouri alumni
People from Spencer, Iowa
People from Sioux Center, Iowa
21st-century American male writers
American political scientists
Writers from Iowa